In Greek mythology, Kalydnos (Ancient Greek: Κάλυδνος, Latinized as Calydnus) was a son of Uranus and the first king of Thebes, after whom the city was thought to have been called Calydna. He was believed to have built the first fortifications of the city, which was why Thebes were sometimes referred to as the "citadel of Calydnus". Calydnus was succeeded by Ogygus.

A certain Calydnus was also the mythical eponym of the island Calydna near Troy.

Notes

References 

 Hornblower, Simon, Lykophron, Alexandra: Greek Text, Translation, Commentary, and Introduction. Oxford University Press. Great Clarendon Street, Oxford, OX2 6DP, United Kingdom. 2015. 
 Stephanus of Byzantium, Stephani Byzantii Ethnicorum quae supersunt, edited by August Meineike (1790-1870), published 1849. A few entries from this important ancient handbook of place names have been translated by Brady Kiesling. Online version at the Topos Text Project.

Theban kings

Kings in Greek mythology
Theban characters in Greek mythology